Good Advice is a 2001 film.

Good Advice may also refer to:

Good Advice (album), by Basia Bulat, 2016
Good Advice (TV series), 1993
"Good Advice" (Mondo Rock song), 1984
"Good Advice", a song by Willie Dixon from the 1988 album Hidden Charms
"Good Advices", a song by R.E.M. from the 1985 album Fables of the Reconstruction